"Somebody Like Me" is a song written by Liz Seaver from Skerries, Dublin and recorded by Irish singer Samantha Mumba and released in association with RTÉ's music entertainment series The Hit. The song peaked at number 5 on the Irish charts.

Mumba told the  Herald "What was foremost on my mind was showcasing the song for the writer. I really wanted to do a good job for them and I'm delighted it all came together"

Track listing

Charts

References

2013 songs
2013 singles
Samantha Mumba songs